Messene is an ancient town in Messenia, Greece.

Messene may also mean:

 Messini, a modern town in Messenia, Greece
 Messina, a city in Sicily named after the ancient town in Messenia, Greece
 Messene (mythology), a mythological character associated with Messenia
 Messene Province, a district including Messini

See also
 Messina (disambiguation), a number of places, people and other objects named after Messina, Sicily